The Venerable Ambalangoda Polwatte Buddhadatta Mahanayake Thera (A. P. Buddhadatta) (1887–1962) was a Theravada Buddhist monk and a professor of Buddhist philosophy at Vidyalankara University. During 1928 he travelled to Switzerland to teach Pāli but found no suitable students.

In 1954, he was the first Sri Lankan monk to be awarded as the Agga Maha Pandita by Burma (Myanmar). He wrote several books on Pali language, and was a member of the inaugural staff of Nalanda College, Colombo and a member of the Ananda College staff.

Works
Concise Pali-English Dictionary (1957)
Pali Sahithya (1962)
Oalibhasappawesaniya (Pali grammer teacher in Burmese - 1908)
Pali Nigandu (Burmese - English word builder for pali words- 1908)
Buddhagosoppathi Pali book transleted to Burmese (1908)
Bhidhamma Mathruka Swarupaya - Transletion from Burmese to Sinhala (1911)
Pali Basappaweniya -Sinhala Translation (1912)
Visuddhi Magga Edition (1914)
Pali Bashawatharanaya 1 (1923)
Pali Bashawatharanaya 2 (1925)
Pali Patawali (1926)
Thribhasha Rathnakaraya (1928)
Apadhana Pali Edition (1929)
Pali Bashawatharanaya 3 (1930)
Pali Wakya Vivechanaya (1933)
Pali Wakya Rachanawa ha Pariwarthana Parichaya (1947)
Patamapaatawali (1948)
Pali -Sinhala Dictionary (1950)
Winya Winichchaya ha Uththara Winichchaya Edition (1952)
Thripitaka Suchiya (1953)
Abhidhammawathara Edition (1954)
Namarupa Parichcheda Edition (1954)
Dhammapadhattakatha Edition (1956)
Jinakalamali Sinhala Translation (1957)
Namarupa Parichcheda English Edition (1914)
Abhidhammawathara English Edition (1915)
Ruparupa Wibhagaya English Edition (1915)
Sammoha Winodhini English Edition (1923)
Winaya Winichchaya & Uththara Winichchaya English Edition (1927)
Niddesa Atuwa (1940)
New Pali Course 1 (1937)
New Pali Course 2 (1938)
Higher Pali Course (1951)
Aids to Pali Conversation & Translation (1951)

See also
Thero

References

External links
Biography of Polwatte Buddhadhatta Maha Swaminwahanse

1887 births
1962 deaths
Academic staff of the University of Kelaniya
Pali-language writers
Sinhalese academics
Faculty of Nalanda College, Colombo
Sri Lankan Buddhist monks
Theravada Buddhist monks
Theravada Buddhism writers
Faculty of Ananda College
20th-century Buddhist monks
Sri Lankan recipients of Agga Maha Pandita